Suspension is a ghost town in Bullock County, Alabama, United States.

History 
The settlement began as an ancient Muscogee village called "Chananagi".

The name "Suspension" derives from the temporary suspension of railroad construction at the settlement. The Mobile and Girard Railroad incorporated in 1849 and began laying a track southwest from Phenix City, Alabama. Because the track laying was temporarily suspended at Stewarts Mill, the location became known as "Suspension". The track was finally completed to Union Springs in 1859–60.

Bullock County Road 40 crosses the now-abandoned railway at Suspension, though nothing remains of the settlement.

References 

Ghost towns in Alabama
Populated places in Bullock County, Alabama